This is a list of Cuban comic creators. Although comics have different formats, this list mainly focuses on comic book and graphic novel creators. However, some creators of comic strips are also found here, as are some of the early innovators of the art form.

This list contains all authors with Cuba as country of origin, although they may have published, or now be resident in other countries.

A – D
Luis García Fresquet (Chamaco)
Abela, Eduardo
Arístides Hernández Guerrero also known as Ares
Aguilar, Antonio
Alba, Orlando
Alfonso, Reinaldo
Alfonso Cruz, Roberto also known as Robe
Gutiérrez Vásquez, Alfredo
Alonso, Dora
Alonso, Fabio
Alonso, Manolo
Alonso, Miriam
Alpizar, Pedro
Alvárez, Moreno
Alvárez, Pedro
Alvárez Cabada, Sommy
Andrés
Antro
Aparicio, Walfrido also known as Wal
Aragón, D.
Pumariega, Arístide
Armada, Santiago also known as Chago
Arroyito
Artiles Acosta, Miguel
Avellanet, Thelma
Avilés Montalvo, Cecilio
Bandomo, Luis
Barredo, Eduardo
Barrionuevo, Rafaél
Barro, Carla
Behmaras, Marcos
Bencomo, Luis
Benítez, Adigio
Bertrán, Juan
Betancourt, Juan
Betanzos Hernández, Miguel
Blanco Ávila, Francisco
Blanco Hernández, Francisco
Bulit, Ilse
Caignet B., Félix
Callejas A., Miguel
Calvo, Alfredo
Canovaca
Cánovas, Alexis
Cantelli, Adelfa
Caparó, Javier also known as Kaparó
Capdevila, Samuel
Capotel, Gladys
Carballido Rey, Juan
Cárdenas, Mike
Cardi, Juan
Cardoso Onelio, Jorge
Villar Alemán, Carlos
Carranza Rouselot, Lucio
Casaus, Victor
Castellanos, Ramón
Castillo Barzaga, Luis
Avilés Montalvo, Cecilio also known as Cecilio
Ceballos López, Ubaldo
Chavarría, Daniel
Chavianol, Daína
Chirino, Lilian
Claudio
Cordero, Victor also known as Vic
Coto
Couto, Armando
Cruz, Marta
Cruz Montano, José also known as Pecruz
Dagoberto
Daiviel López, Karel
Damián González, Ignacio
De Armas, Jesús
De Jesús Ramos, Ulises
De La Torriente, Ricardo
De La Nuez, René
Delgado Vélez, José F. also known as Delga
Del Real, Aramis
De Montemar, René
Díaz, Hilario
Díaz, Pedro
Díaz Portillo, Miguel
Díaz Rafael, Gregorio
Díaz Rivero, Recaredo
Domínguez, José R.
Dopico
Dueñas
Duque Estrada
Duque Sánchez, Luis Oscar
Durán Llopís, Alexis

E – K
Escobar Froilán
Estapé, Angel
Estapé, Newton
E.T., Jorge
Fabiana
Falbello, Luis
Feijoó, Samuel
Fernández, Juan Carlos
Fernández Franco, Emilio
Ferrufino, Rafaél
Fontanillas, Silvio
Fornés Collado, Rafaél
Frades, E.
Frémez
Fresquet, Fresquito
Fresquet Chamaco, Luis
Fuentes, Norberto
Fuentes, Plácido
Fundora, Lázaro
Galindo, Adolfo
García, Antonio
García, David
García, Nelson
García Cabrera, Enrique
García Cañizares, René
García, Maikel
García Leyva, Alberto
García Pampín, Ricardo
García Rodríguez, Domingo
García Rodríguez, Felipe also known as Felgar
García Terminel, Domingo
Gasca
Geli
Gil, Roberto
Gómez Ruiz, Antonio
González, Teresita
González Díaz, Gaspar
González Hijo, Carmelo
González Reyes, Rolando
González Viera, Pedro also known as Péglez
Grant, Francisco
Guerra, Félix
Guerra Pensado, Jorge Luis
Gutiérrez Saborit, Eusebio also known as Chevo
Gutiérrez Vásquez, Alfredo also known as Alfredo
Hechavarría, Omar also known as Omar
Henríquez, Hernán also known as Hernán H.
Hernández, Luis Manuel
Hernández, Sergio
Hernández Cárdenas
Hernández Guerrero, Roberto
Hernández Valdés, Manuel also known as Manuel
Honoré
Jaime, Demetrio
Janer, César
Javier
Jiménez, Teresa
Jordi, Virgilio
Kuchilán Sol, Mario

L – Q
 Enrique A. Lacoste - (Wankarani) 
Lamar Cuervo, Manuel also known as Lillo
Landaluze, Patricio
Lázaro
Leyva Rosa
Lillo, Rafaél
Linares Díaz, Adalberto
Llaguno, Oscar
López, Juan José also known as Juan José
López Palacios, José Luis also known as José Luis
Lorenzo Sosa, Luis
Luaces
Lursen, Niko
Má Argudín, Angel
Hernández Valdés, Manuel also known as Manuel
Mantilla, Alfredo
Marcelino
Mariño Souto, Antonio also known as Ñico
Martín, Angel
Martín, Pedro
Martínez, Gianni also known as Gianni
Martínez, José
Martínez, René also known as René
Martínez, Yuri
Martínez Sopeña, René
Martínez Gaínza, Virgilio also known as Virgilio
Martirena Hernández, Alfredo
Massaguer, Conrado W.
Matamoros, Luis also known as Lumat
Maza, Heriberto
Menrique Ardión, Alberto
Miguel
Mirabal, Alberto
Miranda, Anisia
Mizrahí Marcos, José
Morales, Maurilio also known as Dodo
Morales, Pedro
Morales Ajubel, Alberto
Morales Vega, Fidel
Morante Boyerizo, Rafaél
Motta, Francisco
Muñoz, Honorio
Muñoz Bachs, Eduardo also known as Bachs
Nelson
Niple Mamerto, L.
Nogueras, Wichi
Nordelo
Novoa, Mario
Nuñez, Javier
Nuñez, Raúl
Nuñez Machín, Ana also known as África
Nuñez Rodríguez, Enrique
Oliver Medina, Jorge also known as Oli
Orta, Jesús also known as Indio Naborí
Ortega, Elio
Ortega, Gregorio
Ortega Vásquez, Elio
Ortiz, Marcelino
Osvaldo
Pablo José
Padrón Blanco, Ernesto
Padrón Blanco, Juan
Pazos, Antonio
Peña, Antonio
Peña Mora, Rodolfo
Peñalver, Moreno
Pérez, Galdós
Pérez, Olga Marta
Pérez Alfaro, Manuel
Pérez Lujardo, Pavel also known as Pavel
Perna, Mirtha
Piñera, Virgilio
Ponce, Mario
Portell Vilá, Heriberto
Posada, José Luis
Prado Álvarez, Gustavo also known as Pitín
Prohías, Antonio
Pumariega, Arístide also known as Arístide

R – Z
Raggi, Tulio
Ramos Puig, Gabriel also known as Gaby
Reyes, Chaly
Reyes Ramos, Ricardo also known as Richard
Reyes, Sarah
Rido
Rivera, Guillermo
Rivero, Carlos
Riverón
Robreño, Carlos
Robreño, Eduardo
Robreño, Gustavo
Roca, Blas also known as Tío Francisco
Rodríguez, Félix
Rodríguez, Gustavo also known as Garrincha
Rodríguez Suría, Horacio also known as Horacio
Rodríguez Quiñones, Horacio also known as Horacio R.Q.
Rodríguez Ruiz, Francisco also known as Panchito
Rodríguez, Silvio also known as Silvio
Rodríguez Zayas, Tomás also known as Tomy
Rodríguez Torres, Nilda
Rodríguez Espinosa, Alberto Enrique also known as Alben
Roger
Rodulfo M.
Rojas, Mirtha
Rosales, Guillermo
Roseñada, Leopoldo
Rosita
Ruiz, Juan
Ruiz, Luis
Saguez, Jordi
Salas, Isauro Antonio
Sánchez López, Vicente also known as Vicente
Sánchez, Magaly
Sansón Castro, Orlando
Santiago, Felipe
Santos, Mercedes
Sanz, Lucía
Saúl
Serapión
Suárez, Martha
Suárez Lemus, Orestes
Suárez Méndez, Pedro José also known as Pedro
Simanca, Osmani
Tamayo Maillo, Évora also known as Évora
Tejedor, Cabrera Octavio
Toledo, E.
Torres Albuerne, Wilfredo
Torres Martínez, Tomás also known as Tomaso
Tosta, Mario
Urra, Agustín
Valdés Díaz, Angel
Valdés, Fran
Valdés, Jaime
Valdés, Sonia
Valdez Díaz, Humberto also known as Val
Vázquez Portal, Manuel
Vega, Luis
Velasco, Angel
Vergara, Tomás
Vian, Ivette
Vidal, Abelardo
Vidal, Carlos P.
Villamil
Villar Alemán, Antonio also known as Tony
Villar Alemán, Carlos also known as Carlucho
Vitón, José Luis
Vladimir
Wilson Valera, Luis
Ximénez, Tony
Yañez, Alberto
Zaldarriaga, Rafaél

References

Cuban comic creators